Jimena Valentina Guevara Barón (born 24 May 1987), better known as Jimena Barón or J Mena, is an Argentine actress and singer.

Career

Acting career 

Her beginnings in the world of art and entertainment date back to her childhood. It was with her foray into the cinema, when she was ten years old, that she made herself known to the public, by playing the leading role of little Aneta in the 1998 film El Faro. Her interpretation of Loli in Gasoleros she was nominated for two consecutive years for the Martín Fierro Awards for Best Child Actress, winning it the first time. 

She was followed by her Malena character in the series Calientes and her character of Anita Campos in El sodero de mi vida. This is how she got to participate in productions such as Son amores she played the character of Lila and Los Roldán she played the character of María Roldán González. After a participation in Sos mi vida.  

In 2008, she acted in Por amor a vos she played the character of María Concepción Molinari.

From 2009 and 2010, she played the character of Esperanza "Hope" Bauer in the Cris Morena youth series Casi Ángeles. She also participated in the theatrical season of the cycle in 2009. 

In 2011, she returned to work at Pol-Ka to play the character of María Paula "Poly" Said in the series Los únicos. Also in that year she was called to participate in the contest of Bailando 2011. That same year she participated in the Carlos Baute music video Tu cuerpo bailando en mi cuerpo. 

In 2012, she played the character of Rosa Montes in the series Sos mi hombre broadcast by the screen of Canal 13 and starring Luciano Castro and Celeste Cid. 

From 2015 to 2016, she played the character of Gilda Albarracín in the series Esperanza mía.

In 2016, she played the character of Belén in the series Educando a Nina telecomedy broadcast by Telefe and starring Griselda Siciliani. 

In 2017 she played the character of Florencia "Floro" Petrocelli in the series of Pol-Ka Quiero vivir a tu lado. 

She participated in the contest of Bailando 2018.

Singing career 
Jimena dabbled in music since she was a child, interpreting the odd subject in the different fictions in which she participated, but it is 28 May 2015, which debuts as the band's vocalist "Barón Band" . 

In 2017 Jimena presents "La tonta", her first single as a solo singer and releases her debut album, with the same name. With the release of the album she presented "Qlo" the second single from the album. 

In May 2019, this time, under the artistic name of J Mena, she released her new single "La cobra" that quickly went viral in his native country, making 2,000,000 reproductions, it fits emphasize that now it already has +51,000,000 views on YouTube and +20,000,000 streams on Spotify. After the great debut of "La cobra" J Mena released her second single for her new record work "Quién Empezó" with the biggest female exponent of Argentine trap Cazzu, this single had great acceptance by the public taking 2,100,000 views on YouTube and a #1 in music trends in Argentina. On 2 August, Jimena released her second album of the name of her first single, which includes eight songs of which, among them, she makes two collaborations with the cumbia group Ráfaga and the trap singer Cazzu. After her great success as a solo singer, J Mena signed with Sony Music Enterteiment that already has a new single titled "Taxi Voy" under the management of this record. In November 2019, J Mena won the MTV EMA award for Best Latin Artist.

In February 2020, she published "Puta", a new single that proposes to resignify the insult and talk about the freedom of women. This single caused controversy and was criticized for using a marketing campaign alluding to prostitution. As a result seh cancelled planned shows at Río Negro Apple Festival and at the Villa La Angostura National Gardens Festival, in Neuquén.

In March 2021, after more than a year away from music, she returned and published a new single entitled "Flor de involución", accompanied by a video clip.

In March 2023, she did a performance after 4 years of hiatus at the conclusion of stage play La Vendimia Para Todos.

Personal life 
She dated the Argentine footballer Daniel Osvaldo around 2013 to 2015 and they have son together. In May 2015 they separated, due infidelity from Daniel Osvaldo to Jimena Barón, Barón also denounced him for gender violence.

In 2018 Jimena Barón was in a relationship with Argentinian tennis player, Juan Martín del Potro.

From 2018 to September 2019, Jimena Barón was in a relationship with Mauro Caiazza, her dance partner in the program of Bailando 2018

From September 2020 to 2021, Jimena Barón was in a relationship with television presenter Luis "Tucu" López.

Filmography

Television

Films

Television programs

Videoclips

Discography

Studio albums

Singles

As lead artist

As a featured artist

Promotional singles

Awards and nominations

References

External links 
 
 

1987 births
Actresses from Buenos Aires
Argentine film actresses
Argentine stage actresses
Argentine television actresses
MTV Europe Music Award winners
Living people
Participants in Argentine reality television series
Bailando por un Sueño (Argentine TV series) participants
Bailando_por_un_Sueño_(Argentine_TV_series)_judges
Association footballers' wives and girlfriends